The Sicilian shrew (Crocidura sicula) is a species of mammal in the family Soricidae. It is found in Sicily (Italy) and Gozo (Malta). Its natural habitat is temperate shrubland.

Distribution and habitat 
It is present in Sicily and Ustica (C. s. sicula), in the Egadi Islands (C. s. aegatensis) and in Gozo (C. s. calypso). Sometimes it is also present within citrus groves and cultivated areas as well as, rarely, in rural dwellings.

Subspecies

Four subspecies of the Sicilian shrew are found:

 Crocidura sicula sicula - on the island of Sicily
 Crocidura sicula aegatensis - on the Aegadian Islands
 Crocidura sicula calypso - on the island of Gozo
 Crocidura sicula esuae - a fossil form from the Middle Pleistocene of Sicily

See also
 Endemic Maltese wildlife

References 

Crocidura
Fauna of Malta
Gozo
Mammals described in 1900
Taxonomy articles created by Polbot